A ring current is an electric current carried by charged particles trapped in a planet's magnetosphere. It is caused by the longitudinal drift of energetic (10–200 keV) particles.

Earth's ring current

Earth's ring current is responsible for shielding the lower latitudes of the Earth from magnetospheric electric fields. It therefore has a large effect on the electrodynamics of geomagnetic storms. The ring current system consists of a band, at a distance of 3 to 8 RE, which lies in the equatorial plane and circulates clockwise around the Earth (when viewed from the north). The particles of this region produce a magnetic field in opposition to the Earth's magnetic field and so an Earthly observer would observe a decrease in the magnetic field in this area. The negative deflection of the Earth's magnetic field due to the ring current is measured by the Dst index.

The ring current energy is mainly carried around by the ions, most of which are protons. However, one also sees alpha particles in the ring current, a type of ion that is plentiful in the solar wind. In addition, a certain percentage are O+ oxygen ions, similar to those in the ionosphere of Earth, though much more energetic. This mixture of ions suggests that ring current particles probably come from more than one source.

The ring current and geomagnetic storms

During a geomagnetic storm, the number of particles in the ring current will increase. As a result, there is a decrease in the effects of geomagnetic field.

See also 
 Van Allen radiation belt

References 

 

Geophysics
Space science
Space plasmas